The Nardi FN.315 was an Italian training monoplane developed from the earlier Nardi FN.305 and produced by the Fratelli Nardi company.

Development
First flown on 10 July 1938 the FN.315 was an improved version of the FN.305. It had a revised tail unit, improved cockpit canopy and wing improvements. The FN.315 was a low-wing cantilever monoplane of mixed construction. It had tailskid landing gear, with the main gear retracting inwards, and room for two crew in tandem in an enclosed cockpit. It was powered by a nose-mounted inline piston engine and various engines were evaluated during flight trials, originally with a 205 hp (153 kW) Alfa-Romeo 115 and also a 200 hp (149 kW) Argus As 10E and a 230 hp (172 kW) Hirth HM.508.

The aircraft went into production and six Hirth-powered aircraft were produced, including two for the Swiss Air Force. A further 25 Alfa-Romeo powered aircraft were built for the Italian Air Force and were used as intermediate trainers.

Operators

Regia Aeronautica

Royal Hungarian Air Force

Royal Romanian Air Force
Romanian Air Force - Postwar.

Swiss Air Force

Specifications (FN.315 Alfa Romeo)

See also

References

 
 

FN.315
1930s Italian military trainer aircraft
Low-wing aircraft
Single-engined tractor aircraft
Aircraft first flown in 1938